Joseph Francel (September 2, 1895 – January 25, 1981) was an electrician from Cairo, New York, who was the state of New York's executioner from 1939 until 1953.

Life and career
He was a World War I veteran, having served as a sergeant in the United States Army.

His first execution was the triple electrocution of Anton Myslivec, Everett McDonald, and Theodore Maselkiewicz on December 21, 1939 in Sing Sing's death chamber. Among those he executed were Julius and Ethel Rosenberg. Like his predecessors, Francel also performed electrocutions in the neighboring states that used the electric chair as method of execution.

After the execution of William Draper, whom he had electrocuted in Sing Sing on July 23, 1953, Francel decided to quit his job.

At the time of his resignation in August 1953, The New York Times reported that Francel was dissatisfied with his pay of $150 per execution, and that he was particularly exasperated about threats to his life.

References

See also

Place of birth missing
Place of death missing
1895 births
1981 deaths
19th-century American people
American executioners
Julius and Ethel Rosenberg
People from Cairo, New York
American electricians